The 1951 Tour de Suisse was the 15th edition of the Tour de Suisse cycle race and was held from June 15 to June 23,1951. The race started and finished in Zürich. The race was won by Ferdinand Kübler.

General classification

References

1951
1951 in Swiss sport
1951 Challenge Desgrange-Colombo